The Delaware North Building is a mixed-use development in Buffalo, New York. The 12-story, 330,000-square-foot mixed-use building features Class A office space, a 120-room Westin hotel, ground level retail, a 7,000-square-foot outdoor courtyard, and an adjacent structured parking ramp. Delaware North's World Headquarters anchors the building.

Construction
The new building replaces the two-story Delaware Court building (1917–2014) at the northwest corner of Delaware Avenue and Chippewa Street and occupies a 1.95-acre site. The new building replicates the iconic curved façade of the old, using terracotta features of the original structure. The building features 193,000 sq ft of class A office space on the sixth through 12th floors, a 116-room hotel occupying 104,000 sq ft, 18,000 sq ft of retail space, and indoor parking for 593 vehicles in a five-level attached parking ramp. The building's 2,600-square-foot lobby features the largest living green wall in Western New York, a 22 ft × 21 ft expanse of plants providing beauty, improving indoor air quality, and reducing energy use. In 2019, the building received a LEED Silver certification from the U.S. Green Building Council.

Operations
The Delaware North Building serves as headquarters for namesake company Delaware North, which also operates a 116-room Westin hotel and Patina 250 restaurant within the building. Other tenants include KeyBank offices and retail branch, UBS Financial Services, the Department of Homeland Security, the Cullen Foundation, and Osteopathic Wellness Medicine.

External links
 Skyscraperpage building page
 Emporis building page
 Live camera feed of building
 250 Delaware Avenue Property Page
Time-lapse installation by Botanicus

Gallery

See also
LECOM Harborcenter
The Avant
List of tallest buildings in Buffalo

References

Skyscraper office buildings in Buffalo, New York
Skyscrapers in Buffalo, New York
Skyscraper hotels in New York (state)